Since its formation in 1969, the drama troupe Kotéba National du Mali has performed classic pieces of by Malian, African, and even European authors. In 1979 in search of a form of theatrical expression true to its traditional Bambaran heritage, the group took the form of the koteba consisting of chants, dance, burlesque comedy and comic satires. The group's mission is to promote theatre in general and that of Mali in particular by giving value to traditional forms of popular national theater. Today, the Kotéba National is engaged in the adaptation of modern techniques and methods to preserve and reemphasize the dramatic expression of the Malian people.

Repertoire
 1969 : La Mort de Chaka (Seydou Badjan Kouyaté)
 1970 : Une si belle leçon de patience (Mansa M. Diabaté)
 1972 : La Grande Prédiction
 1972 : La Diaspora noire
 1972 : Nègres, qu’avez-vous fait ? (Alkaly Kaba)
 1972 : Les Hommes de Backchich
 1976 : Les Gens des Marais (Wolé Soyinka)
 1979 : Au mystérieux pays de Kaïdara (Amadou Hampaté Ba)
 1979 : Kotè Tulon I « Cè tè malo »
 1979 : On joue la comédie (Senouvo Agbota Zinsou) Togo
 1980 : Kotè tlon II « Angoisses paysannes »
 1983 : Kotè tlon III « Fugula nafama et Bura Musa Jugu »
 1986 : Bougounieri
 1988 : Wari (Ousmane Sow)
 1989 : Féréké nyamibugu
 1991 : Ansigué (Abdoulaye Diawara)
 1996 : La Prise de Sikasso (Dr Abdoulaye Diallo)
 1998 : I Kofle (création collective)
 1998 : De l’Éden au Mandé (Massa Makan Diabaté)
 1998 : Samanyana Basi (super production)
 1999 : Kun cèma turuni (création collective)
 2000 : La Valeur d’un serment (Younouss Touré)
 2000 : Mali Sadio (Fily Dabo Sissoko)
 2001 : Kaïdara (Ousmane Sow et Gabriel Magma Konaté)
 2002 : Politiki kèlè (Gabriel Magma Konaté)
 2003 : Bakari jan et Bilisi (adaptation de Gabriel Magma Konaté)
 2006 : Les Fous démocrates
 2008 : Dugubakonoko

Tours
At the national level
Numerous tours covering nearly all of Mali. Usually around ten showings monthly.

At the international level
 Participation at the festival de la jeunesse francophone 1974
 Participation at the festival Mondial du théâtre amateur (Monaco) 1981
 Tour of cultural exchange in Côte d'Ivoire 1981
 Participation at the festival international de théâtre pour le développement FITD, 3rd Edition (Ansigué).
 Participation at the festival international du théâtre pour le développement (La Prise de Sikasso et Les Aveugles voleurs)

Awards
 Laureat of the 12th concourse of inter-African theater (living theater) 1982

References

Theatre companies in Mali
Theatre in Mali